Romantic Blue is a 1995 romantic drama crime thriller from Thailand. Starring the king of pop during the 1990s in Thailand Somchai Khemglad, and Suttida Kasemsan. It was once an all-time top grossing Thai movie and winner of numerous awards.

Plot
A young mechanic Mai and his educated younger brother Men fall in love with the same girl, Pom. Mai met Pom when he was working on Poms' father's car, and Men felt love at first sight when he saw Pom at school. Unfortunately, their father is sick and needs surgery. However, the hospital operation is too expensive and the brothers cannot afford the money, and even if Mai repairs 100 cars it will not be enough. Mai later is forced to get help from his criminal uncle Bo who teams Mai up with a crazy car thief. However, the thief turns out to be a real psycho and kills one of the security workers during the robbery. Mai dislikes the car thief's method and breaks the contract with him. Now the thief starts a personal manhunt against Mai and his brother.

Cast
 Somchai Kemglad as Mai
 Suttida Kasemsan Na Ayutthaya as Pom
 Aaron Pavilai as Uncle Bo
 Pramote Seangsorn as Men
 Surasak Wonthai as Car Thief

Awards
Won the 1995 Thailand National Film Association Awards for: Best Motion Picture, Best Director (Rashane Limtrakul), Best Leading Actor (Somchai Kemglad), Best Leading Actress (Suttida Kasemsan Na Ayutthaya), Best Supporting Actor (Aaron Pavilai), Best Movie Script, Best Film Editing, Best Cinematography.

Won the 1995 Entertainment Correspondents Association Of Thailand's Suraswadi Awards for: Best Leading Actress (Suttida Kasemsan Na Ayutthaya), Best Cinematography, Best Motion Picture (top-grossing).

References

 Listal – http://www.listal.com/viewentry/9588579
 Letterbox New Zealand – http://letterboxd.com/film/romantic-blue/
 Thai movies list 1995 – http://www.thaiworldview.com/tv/act.php?myChoice=1995&mySearch=5

External links
 
 MUBI – https://mubi.com/films/romantic-blue

Thai romantic drama films
Films set in Thailand
Best Picture Suphannahong National Film Award winners
Thai crime drama films
Thai thriller films